Mayetiola hordei,, the barley stem gall midge, is a cereal pest in Tunisia, closely related to the Hessian fly.

References 

Cecidomyiinae
Agricultural pest insects
Nematoceran flies of Europe
Diptera of Asia
Diptera of Africa